Mohamed Armoumen (born 19 September 1979) is a football striker who has been in the national team of Morocco.

Club career
He previously played for Lokeren in the Belgian First Division.

References

External links

 Profile and stats - Lokeren

1979 births
Living people
Footballers from Casablanca
Association football forwards
Moroccan footballers
Morocco international footballers
K.S.C. Lokeren Oost-Vlaanderen players
Belgian Pro League players
Botola players
Emirates Club players
Al-Arabi SC (Qatar) players
Kuwait SC players
Moroccan expatriate sportspeople in Qatar
Kuwait Premier League players
Moroccan expatriate sportspeople in Belgium
Moroccan expatriate sportspeople in Kuwait
Moroccan expatriate sportspeople in the United Arab Emirates
Expatriate footballers in Belgium
Expatriate footballers in the United Arab Emirates
Expatriate footballers in Kuwait
Wydad AC players
Raja CA players
AS FAR (football) players
Expatriate footballers in Qatar
Wydad de Fès players
JS Massira players